Wadi Shueib, Arabic for the Valley of Jethro and properly Wadi Shuʿeib but with many variant romanisations,  is a wadi in Jordan.

The alluvial fan of the wadi where it enters the southern part of the eastern Jordan Valley is known as Wadi Nimrin, which leads into the Jordan River. The site of Tell Nimrin is located at the southern end of Wadi Nimrin.

Etymology
Wadi Shueib is named for the Biblical figure Jethro, Shuʿeib in Arabic.

Geography and ecology

Towns and villages along the wadi include Salt, Fuheis, and Mahis, which discharge treated and untreated sewage into it.

Modern dam
An earth-filled dam was constructed across it in 1968.

Archaeology
Excavations have confirmed that the area was a major site during Jordan's Neolithic period.

See also
 Rivers of Jordan

Notes

References

Citations

Bibliography
 .
 .
 .



External Links
 Photos of Wadi Shu'eib at the American Center of Research

Rivers of Jordan
Tributaries of the Jordan River